The Bagobo rat (Bullimus bagobus) is one of three species of rodent in the genus Bullimus, and in the diverse family Muridae.
It is found in the Visayas and Mindanao, Philippines.

References

External links

Bullimus
Rodents of the Philippines
Mammals described in 1905
Endemic fauna of the Philippines
Fauna of Mindanao
Taxa named by Edgar Alexander Mearns
Taxonomy articles created by Polbot